Punta Borinquen Light (Faro de Punta Borinquen) is a lighthouse located in the old Ramey Air Force Base in Aguadilla, Puerto Rico. The station was established in 1889 by the Spanish government. With the opening of the Panama Canal in 1914, the lighthouse would become "the most important aid to navigation on the route from Europe to Panama". In 1917, the U.S Congress provided funding for a new lighthouse in higher ground.

But before construction began on the new structure, the original lighthouse was severely damaged by the 1918 earthquake that struck the west part of the island. Construction on the new lighthouse was completed in 1922. The light is active aid to navigation and is a housing facility  for the United States Coast Guard.

See also
List of lighthouses in Puerto Rico

References

External links

National Register of Historic Places in Aguadilla, Puerto Rico
Lighthouses on the National Register of Historic Places in Puerto Rico
Historic American Engineering Record in Puerto Rico
Lighthouses completed in 1922
Lighthouses completed in 1889
Spanish Colonial architecture in Puerto Rico
1889 establishments in Puerto Rico
1922 establishments in Puerto Rico